Raymond Wilson Robinson (1895 – 6 January 1964) was an English professional footballer who played as a winger.

References

1895 births
1964 deaths
People from Blaydon-on-Tyne
Footballers from Tyne and Wear
English footballers
Association football wingers
Scotswood F.C. players
Newcastle United F.C. players
Sunderland A.F.C. players
Grimsby Town F.C. players
Eden Colliery Welfare F.C. players
Lancaster City F.C. players
Liverpool Police F.C. players
Shirebrook Miners Welfare F.C. players
Silverwood Colliery F.C. players
English Football League players